Thick as Thieves is a 1999 American crime film based on the novel of the same name by Patrick Quinn and adapted for the screen by Scott Sanders and Arthur Krystal, with Sanders directing. The film stars Alec Baldwin, Andre Braugher, Michael Jai White, Bruce Greenwood and Rebecca De Mornay.

Premise
The film follows an escalating vendetta between professional Chicago thief Mackin (Alec Baldwin) and rising Detroit kingpin Pointy Williams (Michael Jai White) after an attempted double cross.

Cast
 Alec Baldwin as Mackin, "The Thief"
 Andre Braugher as Dink Reeves
 Michael Jai White as Pointy Williams
 Rebecca De Mornay as Det. Louise Petrone
 Ricky Harris as Rodney
 David Byrd as Sal Capetti
 Bruce Greenwood as Bo
 Richard Edson as Danny
 Robert Miano as Frank Riles
 Khandi Alexander as Janet Hussein
 Janeane Garofalo as Anne
 Jack McGee as Chief
 Nicole Pulliam as Cassandra
 Terrence Evans as Bus Driver
 Thomas Babuscio as Ray

Casting
Actress Julia Sweeney is billed for a part that was cut from the film but remains credited.

References

External links
 
 

1999 films
1990s crime films
American crime films
Films directed by Scott Sanders (director)
1999 directorial debut films
1999 crime films
1990s English-language films
1990s American films